The 1945 Virginia Cavaliers football team represented the University of Virginia during the 1945 college football season. The Cavaliers were led by ninth-year head coach Frank Murray and played their home games at Scott Stadium in Charlottesville, Virginia. They competed as independents, finishing with a record of 7–2. On October 8, 1945, Virginia made their first appearance in the AP Poll in school history when they were ranked 20th in the year's first poll. They dropped from the poll the following week, but reentered November 5th as they continued a seven-game win-streak. The Cavaliers did not finish ranked, however, being knocked from the polls after season-ending losses to rivals Maryland and North Carolina. Their first ranked finish would come in 1951. Murray left the team following the season to return to coaching at Marquette, where he had coached from 1927 to 1936. He ended his career at Virginia as the school's longest-serving and winningest coach.

Schedule

References

Virginia
Virginia Cavaliers football seasons
Virginia Cavaliers football